Inhibitors of dipeptidyl peptidase 4 (DPP-4 inhibitors or gliptins) are a class of oral hypoglycemics that block the enzyme dipeptidyl peptidase-4 (DPP-4). They can be used to treat diabetes mellitus type 2.

The first agent of the class – sitagliptin – was approved by the FDA in 2006.

Glucagon increases blood glucose levels, and DPP-4 inhibitors reduce glucagon and blood glucose levels. The mechanism of DPP-4 inhibitors is to increase incretin levels (GLP-1 and GIP), which inhibit glucagon release, which in turn increases insulin secretion, decreases gastric emptying, and decreases blood glucose levels.

A 2018 meta-analysis found no favorable effect of DPP-4 inhibitors on all-cause mortality, cardiovascular mortality, myocardial infarction or stroke in patients with type 2 diabetes.

Examples
Drugs belonging to this class are:
 Sitagliptin (FDA approved 2006, marketed by Merck & Co. as Januvia)
 Vildagliptin (EU approved 2007, marketed in the EU by Novartis as Galvus)
 Saxagliptin (FDA approved in 2009, marketed as Onglyza)
 Linagliptin (FDA approved in 2011, marketed as Tradjenta by Eli Lilly and Company and Boehringer Ingelheim)
 Gemigliptin (approved in Korea in 2012, marketed by LG Life Sciences) Marketed as Zemiglo
 Anagliptin (approved in Japan in 2012, marketed by Sanwa Kagaku Kenkyusho Co., Ltd. and Kowa Company, Ltd.)
 Teneligliptin (approved in Japan in 2012)
 Alogliptin (FDA approved 2013, marketed by Takeda Pharmaceutical Company)
 Trelagliptin (approved for use in Japan in 2015)
 Omarigliptin (MK-3102) (approved in Japan in 2015, developed by Merck & Co.; research showed that omarigliptin can be used as once-weekly treatment and generally well tolerated throughout the base and extension studies)
 Evogliptin (approved for use in South Korea)
 Gosogliptin (approved for use in Russia)
 Dutogliptin (being developed by Phenomix Corporation), Phase III

Other chemicals which may inhibit DPP-4 include:
 Berberine, an alkaloid found in plants of the genus Berberis, inhibits dipeptidyl peptidase-4 which may at least partly explains its antihyperglycemic activity.

Adverse effects
In those already taking sulphonylureas, there is an increased risk of low blood sugar when taking a medicine in the DPP-4 drug class.

Adverse effects include nasopharyngitis, headache, nausea, heart failure, hypersensitivity and skin reactions. 

The U.S. Food and Drug Administration (FDA) is warning that the type 2 diabetes medicines like sitagliptin, saxagliptin, linagliptin, and alogliptin may cause joint pain that can be severe and disabling. FDA has added a new Warning and Precaution about this risk to the labels of all medicines in this drug class, called dipeptidyl peptidase-4 (DPP-4) inhibitors. However, studies assessing risk of rheumatoid arthritis among DPP-4 inhibitor users have been inconclusive.

A 2014 review found increased risk of heart failure with saxagliptin and alogliptin, prompting the FDA in 2016 to add warnings to the relevant drug labels.

A 2018 meta analysis showed that use of DPP-4 inhibitors was associated with a 58% increased risk of developing acute pancreatitis compared with placebo or no treatment.

A 2018 observational study suggested an elevated risk of developing inflammatory bowel disease (specifically, ulcerative colitis), reaching a peak after three to four years of use and decreasing after more than four years of use.

A 2020 Cochrane systematic review did not find enough evidence of reduction of all-cause mortality, serious adverse events, cardiovascular mortality, non-fatal myocardial infarction, non-fatal stroke or end-stage renal disease when comparing metformin monotherapy to dipeptidyl peptidase-4 inhibitors for the treatment of type 2 diabetes.

Cancer
In response to a report of precancerous changes in the pancreases of rats and organ donors treated with the DPP-4 inhibitor sitagliptin, the United States FDA and the European Medicines Agency each undertook independent reviews of all clinical and preclinical data related to the possible association of DPP-4 inhibitors with pancreatic cancer. In a joint letter to the New England Journal of Medicine, the agencies stated that they had not yet reached a final conclusion regarding a possible causative relationship.

A 2014 meta-analysis found no evidence for increased pancreatic cancer risk in people treated with DPP-4 inhibitors, but owing to the modest amount of data available, was not able to completely exclude possible risk.

Combination drugs
Some DPP-4 inhibitor drugs have received approval from the FDA to be used with metformin concomitantly with additive effect to increase the level of glucagon-like peptide 1 (GLP-1) which also decreases hepatic glucose production.

See also 
 Development of dipeptidyl peptidase-4 inhibitors

References